The 1976–77 season was the 62nd season of the Isthmian League, an English football competition.

It was the first Isthmian League season to use goal difference as a tie-breaker.

Enfield won Division One, while Tilbury won Division Two.

At the end of the season the league divisions were renamed: Division One was renamed the Premier Division and Division Two was renamed Division One. Also, seventeen new clubs were newly admitted to the league, they were placed to new Division Two, as the league expanded to three divisions.

Division One

Division One consisted of 22 clubs, including 20 clubs from the previous season and two clubs, promoted from Division Two:
Croydon
Tilbury

League table

Division Two

Division Two consisted of 22 clubs, including 20 clubs from the previous season and two new clubs, relegated from Division One:
Clapton
Oxford City

League table

References

Isthmian League seasons
I